Andrew Bridge is a Broadway and West End lighting designer, who has worked on many Broadway productions, including The Phantom of the Opera. He has won the Tony Award for Best Lighting Design three times: in 1988 for The Phantom of the Opera, 1995 for Sunset Boulevard, and in 1999 for Fosse.

In December 2010 he became the 12th ever 'Fellow of the ALD'. This was awarded to him for his outstanding contribution to the art of lighting design.

References

External links
 

American lighting designers
Tony Award winners
Year of birth missing (living people)
Living people